"Håll om mig hårt" is a song by Swedish group Panetoz. The song was released in Sweden as a digital download on 28 February 2016, and was written by Jimmy Jansson, Karl-Ola Kjellholm, Jakke Erixson, Pa Modou Badjie, Njol Badjie, and Nebeyu Baheru. It took part in Melodifestivalen 2016, and qualified to andra chansen from the fourth semi-final. In andra chansen, it qualified to the final. It placed eighth in the final.

Charts

Release history

References

2015 songs
2016 singles
Melodifestivalen songs of 2016
Panetoz songs
Swedish-language songs
Songs written by Jakke Erixson
Songs written by Jimmy Jansson